Buyuk Ipak Yoli is a station of the Tashkent Metro, the northern terminus of Chilonzor Line. It was opened on 18 August 1980 as part of the second section of Chilonzor Line, between October inkilobi and Maksim Gor'kiy.

The station was previously known as Maksim Gor'kiy. It was renamed on 1 May 1987.

References

Tashkent Metro stations
Railway stations opened in 1980